Stirling Old Bridge is a stone bridge which crosses the River Forth. For over 300 years it provided the lowest crossing point of the Forth and so had strategic importance.

History

The stone bridge was constructed on rubble foundations around 1500 and replaced earlier wooden bridges, including that on which the Battle of Stirling Bridge was fought.

The bridge originally had arches at either end and a defensive gate at the end nearer the burgh. Tolls were levied on goods being taken across the bridge.

In December 1745 General Blakeney, lieutenant governor of Stirling Castle, had one of the bridge arches destroyed to hinder the movement of the Jacobite Army. The destroyed arch was rebuilt in 1749.

In May 1833 the adjacent new road bridge was opened to traffic and the Old Bridge was closed to wheeled traffic.

The bridge was designated as a Category A Listed Building in 1965.

References

External links

Listed bridges in Scotland
Category A listed buildings in Stirling (council area)